John Ross (17 May 1817 – 5 February 1903) was a Scottish Australian drover and explorer.

Ross was born in Bridgend, Scotland. He emigrated to Australia in 1837, arriving in Sydney on 31 August 1837. He first gained employment as a shepherd for George Macleay and in 1838 he joined Charles Bonney in the first cattle drive from the Goulburn River to Adelaide. In South Australia he successfully managed several large sheep properties and conducted exploration of the area.

In 1869 he explored the Stevenson River to Eringa and Mount Humphries; he named the mountains after his children, Sarah, Rebecca, Alexander and John. In 1870 his then employer Thomas Elder recommended Ross' service to Charles Todd, the colony's superintendent of telegraphs and government astronomer. Todd employed Ross to lead exploration of the route for the Australian Overland Telegraph Line. Ross' party ventured across the MacDonnell Ranges, the Simpson Desert, the Phillipson and Giles creeks and the Fergusson Ranges; they also arrived at the Todd River. In March 1871 he arrived at and gave an English name to Alice Springs, however he found out that the European, W. W. Mills has been there before him. The party eventually made their way to Darwin.

Ross was employed by Elder to explore between Peake and Perth. He failed due to lack of fresh water. He went on the manage properties in Victoria and Queensland, later returning to Norwood in South Australia. He died in Adelaide in poverty in 1903.

See also

List of explorers

References

G. W. Symes, Ross, John (1817–1903), Australian Dictionary of Biography, Volume 6, Melbourne University Press, 1976, pp 60–61.

1817 births
1903 deaths
Explorers of Australia
Scottish emigrants to Australia
Australian stockmen